is a 2003 Japanese television drama series.

Awards
6th Nikkan Sports Drama Grand Prix
Won: Best Supporting Actress - Akiko Yada

References

2003 Japanese television series debuts
2003 Japanese television series endings
Japanese drama television series
Fuji TV dramas